PayPay Corporation is a Japanese company that develops electronic payment services. It was established in 2018 as a joint venture between the SoftBank Group and Yahoo Japan through Z Holdings, their holding company. With 38 million users, PayPay is the largest Japanese mobile payment app. In October 2018, it began a QR code and bar code-based payment service, which was developed in collaboration with Paytm, an India-based payment service company. 

From a smartphone app, users link their bank account and add money to their PayPay account.  At the point of sale, the user makes a payment either by scanning a QR code, or by having the clerk scan a bar code on the smartphone.

2020 cybersecurity incident
PayPay server was hacked on November 28, 2020 which was originated in Brazil. As per the operator of PayPay, a server containing personal and financial information of its entire userbase was compromised. The company acknowledged that configuration flaws led to unauthorized access to information. The service operator was later notified of the incident and preventive measures were taken.

References 

Financial technology companies
Mobile payments
Online payments
Payment systems